The 1995–96 Combined Counties Football League season was the 18th in the history of the Combined Counties Football League, a football competition in England.

The league was won by Ashford Town (Middlesex) for the second time, successfully defending their championship win the previous season.

League table

The league was increased from 18 clubs to 22 after four new clubs joined:

Feltham, joining from the Isthmian League after resigning and changing their name from Feltham & Hounslow Borough F.C.
Raynes Park Vale, a merger between Raynes Park F.C. of the Surrey County Premier League and Malden Vale F.C. of the Isthmian League. Malden Vale had been members of the Combined Counties League before, having left in 1989.
Reading Town, joining from the Chiltonian League.
Walton Casuals, joining from the Surrey County Premier League.

References

External links
 Combined Counties League Official Site

1995-96
1995–96 in English football leagues